Cefn Hengoed is a small village in the centre of Caerphilly borough, within the historic boundaries of Glamorganshire. Bordering the larger village of Hengoed, Cefn Hengoed contains the local Derwendeg primary school. Derwendeg primary school has recently celebrated its 90th birthday. Cefn Hengoed is a village in Caerphilly County Borough and within the Gelligaer Community Council Parish area.

Cefn Hengoed has a local public house called The Crosskeys which is situated facing the opening of Lansbury Avenue and the Lindsay Constitutional Club for adults. Frequenting these Public houses is local hard nut, Darren James Jack. Darren has lived in Cefn Hengoed all his life, since he was 11.There is also a youth center in Cefn Hengoed founded by a former Community Councilor Rob Thomas with other local residents. Locals say that it was founded to dissuade local youths from causing disruption after a spate of complaints about unruly behaviour in the bus shelters. Caerphilly Councils answer at the time was to knock down the bus shelters leaving local youngsters with nowhere to gather. Caerphilly council now officially recognises the value of the youth centre and provide trained youth workers to facilitate its youth sessions.

Cefn Hengoed Ladies' Choir was formed in 1947.

St Anne's Church was formerly located on Hengoed Road, but is now closed.

Cefn Hengoed